Michael Mondragon is an American former professional wrestler best known under the ring name Disco Machine. He was one of the six founders of the Southern Californian independent promotion, Pro Wrestling Guerrilla.

Professional wrestling career
Disco Machine kicked off his wrestling career working for Revolution Pro, a prominent SoCal promotion, in 1998. In 2003, he became one of the six owners of brand new SoCal promotion Pro Wrestling Guerrilla, collectively known as the "PWG Six". In 2005, he teamed with Excalibur, Kevin Steen, and Ronin as the new S.B.S., after he and Excalibur turned on Super Dragon. Disco and Excalibur also provide commentary on most of PWG's DVD releases (along with their occasional partner, TARO). He was featured in a multiple page article about Pro Wrestling Guerrilla in FHM magazine's March 2006 issue.

In 2007, Disco Machine appeared with Wrestling Society X, a short-lived promotion produced and broadcast by MTV, where he teamed with Joey "Magnum" Ryan as "That '70s Team".

Disco Machine retired from wrestling in 2012.

Championships and accomplishments
NTW Pro Wrestling
NTW Cruiserweight Championship (1 time)
NWA Pro Wrestling
NWA Pro Los Angeles Light Heavyweight Championship (1 time)
Revolution Pro Wrestling
Mexican Lucha Libre Championship (1 time)
Revolution Pro Junior Heavyweight Championship (1 time)
Vendetta Pro Wrestling
Vendetta Pro Tri-Force Championship (1 time)

References

External links
Pro Wrestling Guerrilla website

1970 births
Living people
20th-century professional wrestlers
21st-century professional wrestlers
American male professional wrestlers
Professional wrestlers from California
Sportspeople from Los Angeles